The Chicora Wood Plantation (originally known as Matanzas) is a former rice plantation in Georgetown County, South Carolina. The plantation itself was established sometime between 1732 and 1736 and the 1819 plantation house still exists today. In 1827, Robert Francis Withers Allston (1801–1864) resigned as surveyor-general of South Carolina to take over full-time management of Chicora Wood, which he had inherited from his father. Chicora Wood served as a home base for his network of rice plantations, which produced 840,000 pounds of rice in 1850 and 1,500,000 pounds by 1860. 401 slaves worked the plantation in 1850, increasing to 630 by 1860.

The house was built in Greek Revival style, on a raised basement typical of the region.  A number of outbuildings still survive on the complex, including the rice mill complex.  It was listed in the National Register of Historic Places on April 11, 1973. It is located in the Pee Dee River Rice Planters Historic District.

References

External links

Chicora Wood Plantation photos and history

Historic American Buildings Survey in South Carolina
Houses on the National Register of Historic Places in South Carolina
National Register of Historic Places in Georgetown County, South Carolina
Greek Revival houses in South Carolina
Houses completed in 1819
Plantations in South Carolina
Plantation houses in South Carolina
Houses in Georgetown County, South Carolina
Historic district contributing properties in South Carolina